Ochetellus punctatissimus is a species of ant in the genus Ochetellus. Described by Emery in 1887, the ant is endemic to Australia.

References

Dolichoderinae
Hymenoptera of Australia
Insects described in 1887